The Cholavaram Airport, or Sholavaram Airport, is an unused airport near Cholavaram, Chennai. It was originally operated by the Royal Air Force as an airbase during World War II. After the war it was abandoned until the airstrip was turned into a venue for drag racing. Most notably, the famous Malayalam actor Jayan was killed in a helicopter accident here during the shooting of his film Kolilakkam on 16 November 1980.

The Indian Army later recovered the lands, which had been illegally occupied by local residents. The military used the area and the remaining airstrip as a surveillance base. There were also plans to use the airport as a secondary landing location for commercial aircraft.

In 2020 the airstrip was taken over by the Government of India, with plans to construct a new airport under the UDAN scheme.

References 

Airports in Tamil Nadu
Defunct airports in India
1940s establishments in British India
Military airbases established in the 1940s
20th-century architecture in India